A pelican crossing, or archaically pelicon crossing (PEdestrian LIght CONtrolled), is a type of pedestrian crossing with traffic signals for both pedestrians and vehicular traffic, activated by call buttons for pedestrians, with the walk signal being directly across the road from the pedestrian. The design is also found in the Isle of Man, the Channel Islands, the island of Ireland, Indonesia and Australia. The crossings began to be phased out in Great Britain in 2016, being replaced with puffin crossings which have pedestrian signals above the call button rather than across the road.

The crossing is usually formed of two poles on either side of the road, each containing three signal heads (one in each direction for drivers and one facing pedestrians) and a call button unit for pedestrians to operate the crossing. The crossing type is distinctive for fixed signal timings (as opposed to the variable timings of puffin crossings and the flashing amber/green man phase, which allows the crossing to clear and drivers to continue when it is. An audible bleep and tactile rotating cone are normally present to aid visually impaired pedestrians.

Pelican crossings are ubiquitous in many countries, but usage of the phrase "pelican crossing" is confined mainly to the UK and Ireland. A comparable system called the HAWK beacon is used in the United States.

History

Etymology 

The name is derived from PELICON, a portmanteau of pedestrian light controlled. The term pelican crossing originated in the United Kingdom, Crown Dependencies and British Overseas Territories, but similar traffic control devices are in use throughout the world. The term is also used in the Republic of Ireland.

Development 
The pelican crossing was a relatively minor development of the "x–way" crossing. This earlier crossing was largely identical to the pelican crossing, but instead of a green light for motorists, featured a white diagonal cross. The intention of this was to distinguish the crossing lights from any nearby junction (standard) traffic lights. The white cross was widely criticised and users and motoring organisations alike called for the white cross to be replaced by a green light. With some changes to the light timings and road markings, the "x–way" crossing became the pelican crossing.

In the United Kingdom, the pelican crossing was the first definitive light-controlled crossing for pedestrians, introduced in 1969. This was after the earlier failed experiment of the panda crossing. Previously only zebra crossings had been used, which have warning signals (Belisha beacons), but no control signals.

In 1974, cast from Dad's Army performed a public information film to explain the pelican crossing, and how it works. In 1976, Paul Greenwood sung "The Pelican Crossing Song", again explaining how a pelican crossing works.

Decommissioning 
Statutory authority for pelican crossings was removed in the 2016 update of the Traffic Signs Regulations and General Directions. After 22 October 2016, no new pelican crossings can be installed on public highways in the UK, except work in progress where there was a six-month saving. Puffin crossings are to be installed instead.

Characteristics
Additionally, a pelican crossing, as distinct from a puffin crossing, has the special feature that while the green man flashes to indicate that pedestrians may continue crossing but may not start to cross, the red light changes to an amber flashing light permitting cars to pass if there are no further pedestrians. This reduces the delay to traffic.

Under UK law, pelican crossings that go straight across the road are defined as a single crossing, even when there is a central island. Therefore, traffic in both directions must wait until pedestrians have finished crossing and the signal is green or flashing amber. This rule is different from similar standard pedestrian crossings where each portion of the crossing is treated as a separate crossing. However, at installations where the crossings that cross each carriageway are separate crossings, the crossing is staggered.

See also
 Pedestrian scramble
 Pegasus crossing
 Toucan crossing

References

 The History of British Roadsigns, Dept. for Transport, 2nd Edition, 1999.

External links
BBC article, on the introduction of Panda crossings, and subsequent developments.

Pedestrian crossings
Road surface markings
Walking in the United Kingdom